The Ligue de Hockey Junior AA Lac St-Louis (Lac Saint-Louis Junior AA Hockey League) was a Junior "AA" (Junior "B" Canada-wide) ice hockey league in the province of Quebec, Canada. The league was sanctioned by Hockey Quebec and Hockey Canada. 

Since 2018-2019 the surviving LSL teams have competed in the Ligue Hockey Metropolitaine Junior AA (LHMJAA). Two teams remain: the Dollard-des-Ormeaux Vipers and Vaudreuil Mustangs (Trois-Lacs Aigles).  

The league champion competes for the Coupe Dodge, the annual Junior AA championship in Quebec.

Teams

Champions
Bold indicates a LSL Regional winner.

2006 West Island Royals
2007 West Island Royals
2008 Deux-Rives Dauphins
2009 West Island Royals
2010 Suroit Express
2011 Suroit Express
2012 West Island Royals
2013 Lakeshore Panthers
2014 Lakeshore Panthers
2015 Versant Ouest Phoenix
2016 Versant Ouest Phoenix
2017 Pierrefonds Barracudas
2018 Trois-Cites Phoenix
2019 Saint-Laurent Phoenix

External links
Hockey Québec Website
Hockey Lac St-Louis

B
B
Hockey Quebec